Wonderland Live was the tenth concert tour by British band Take That, in support of their eighth studio album Wonderland. It began on 5 May 2017, in Birmingham, England at the Genting Arena and continued throughout the UK, Ireland, Australia, New Zealand, Israel and the UAE concluding on 29 November 2017, in Dubai, UAE, at the Dubai Media City Amphitheatre.

This was the group's first tour since they toured Australia in 1995 and also marked their first ever concerts in New Zealand and Israel.

The shows were announced on 22 October 2016. The demand for the tour led to all dates selling out as soon as they went on sale, with some dates selling out in pre-sale alone.

It was their second concert tour since the Progress Live tour in 2011 and the second to feature the band as a trio following the departures of Jason Orange and Robbie Williams.

Opening act
All Saints (not at the cinemas) (UK and Ireland)
Dannii Minogue (Australia)
Harel Skaat (Israel)
 Dina Rabadi (United Arab Emirates)

Setlist
 "Wonderland"
 "Greatest Day"
 "Get Ready For It"
 "Giants"
 "Kidz"
 "Underground Machine"
 "Relight My Fire"       
 "Superstar"                          
 "Hope"                           
 "Acoustic Medley": "Beautiful World"/"Wait"/"Satisfied"/"Lovelife"                              
 "How Deep Is Your Love"  
 "New Day"                          
 "Shine"                               
 "Back For Good"        
 "Patience"                         
 "Pray"                                     
 "It's All For You"                  
 "The Flood"                          
 "Cry"                                   
 "These Days"
 Encore                    
"Never Forget"            
"Rule the World"

Tour dates

Rescheduled shows

Cancelled shows

Band
Musical Director, Keys, Guitar, Sax: Mike Stevens
Guitars: Ben Mark, Milton McDonald
Bass guitar: Lee Pomeroy
Drums: Donavan Hepburn
Keyboards: Marcus Byrne
Tabla, Percussion: Mendi Singh

References

2017 concert tours